Reinach AG railway station is a railway station in the municipality of Reinach, in the Swiss canton of Aargau. It is the penultimate station at the eastern end of the  gauge Schöftland–Aarau–Menziken line of Aargau Verkehr.

Services
The following services serve Reinach:

References

External links 
 

Railway stations in the canton of Aargau
Aargau Verkehr stations